Keratsini Football Club is a Greek football club based in Keratsini, Piraeus, Greece. It plays in Piraeus local championship (EPS Piraeus).

History
Keratsini was founded in 1926 by Mpiskos and Diatsigkos with the name AO Neapoli, who later became ESKO IE, one of the Union Clubs Keratsini Orfeas. It was one of the four founding clubs of Piraeus FCA. In 1926, the team settled in Keratsini, renamed Athletic Football Club (Keratsini). The Club took its final form in 1968 by merging with AO Amfiali.

In 1991, the Keratsini first reached the Fourth Division and in 1994 in Gamma Ethniki. In 1994, the team lost the Greek Amateur Cup final on penalties (5-4). From 1997-2000 and 2004–2006, it again reached Gamma Ethniki League.

For the 2006–2007 season, it competed in Regional League (Fourth Division) and it relegated to the local league. For the season 2007–2008, it won the local championship with a record of 25 wins in 26 games and reached the Fourth division. For the seasons 2008–2013, it was one of the best teams of fourth Division and played twice in Piraeus Cup Final(2010-2012). It won the Piraeus Cup 6 times, in 1990, 1995, 1996, 2010, 2016 and 2017.

Presidents 

 Keratsini
 Gkamilis 
 Kalamitsis (also Presidents of EPSP)
 Miltiades Marinakis
 Kolokotronis
 Kidonakis
 Mposinakis
 Marathiwtis
 Kalafatis

Notables 

 Costas Choumis, transferred in Romania
 Bagiakakos 
 Chamodrakos
 Politis
 Varnalis
 Aggelos Kremmydas
 Doulgeroglou
 Kleisaris

References

Football clubs in Attica
Association football clubs established in 1926
1926 establishments in Greece
Gamma Ethniki clubs